Springtime for Pluto is a cartoon made by Walt Disney Productions in 1944. It was directed by Charles Nichols.

Plot
The Spirit of Spring in the form of a faun dances through the countryside playing his panflute and melting the snow, heralding the end of winter and the beginning of spring. When his revitalizing influence reaches Pluto's doghouse, it causes mushrooms to sprout up under Pluto's chin, waking him from his winter slumber.

Pluto enjoys the scent of trees and plays with some of the forest animals, including a caterpillar undergoing its metamorphosis. When the caterpillar finishes its transformation, Pluto dances with the butterfly, which leads him to be attacked by a hive of angry bees. While escaping from the bees, he lands in a bush of poison ivy and suffers a pollen allergy brought on by goldenrod. A strong April shower chases Pluto back to his doghouse. When the storm passes, the Spirit of Spring comes back, frolicking. A bruised and battered Pluto comes out of his doghouse and chases down the unsuspecting faun.

Voice cast
Pinto Colvig as Pluto
Thurl Ravenscroft as Singing Caterpillar

Home media
The short was released on December 7, 2004 on Walt Disney Treasures: The Complete Pluto: 1930-1947.

References

External links

 Springtime for Pluto at the Encyclopedia of Disney Animated Shorts
 
 Springtime for Pluto at the Internet Animation Database

1940s Disney animated short films
1944 films
Pluto (Disney) short films
1944 animated films
Films produced by Walt Disney
Animated films based on classical mythology
Films scored by Oliver Wallace
RKO Pictures animated short films
Films directed by Charles August Nichols